Adolf Rieder (born 30 January 1915, date of death unknown) was a Swiss wrestler. He competed in the men's Greco-Roman welterweight at the 1936 Summer Olympics.

References

External links
 

1915 births
Year of death missing
Swiss male sport wrestlers
Olympic wrestlers of Switzerland
Wrestlers at the 1936 Summer Olympics
Place of birth missing